Liza Sadovy is a British actress. She is best known for Sweeney Todd: The Demon Barber of Fleet Street (2007), Prime Suspect 3 (1993) and Company (1996). Other television work includes Extras with Ricky Gervais, Midsomer Murders, Babylon, The Honourable Woman, Doctors, EastEnders, Emma, and Vera.

Sadovy went to drama school in the late 1970s.

Sadovy has appeared in numerous theatrical productions in London and New York. Most notably as Madame Morrible in Wicked, Lucinda in Into the Woods, Yvonne in Sunday in the Park with George, and Fräulein Schneider in Cabaret.

References

External links

British actresses
Living people
Year of birth missing (living people)